Kesavan Thazhava (26 March 1903 – 28 November 1969) was an Indian politician from Kerala. He belonged to the Communist Party of India (Marxist). He was born in Thazhava in Karunagappally, Kollam District in Thadathil Veedu.

Career 
He served as the 11th General Secretary of S.N.D.P Yogam, serving from 1935 to 1936. He was a member of Travancore Sree Moolam Popular Assembly from 1937 to 1938. He represented Kerala in Rajya Sabha, the Council of States of India parliament, from 1967 to 1973, and was a leader of the Communist Party of India (Marxist).

Personal life 
He had a daughter, Rema Bai, who married Mahadevan, a rankholder in L.L.B. from Aligarh University

He died on 28 November 1969.

References

1903 births
1984 deaths
Rajya Sabha members from Kerala
Communist Party of India (Marxist) politicians from Kerala